Ischopolis (Ἰσχόπολις) was a city in ancient Pontus. It was near Pharnacia, and was in ruins even in the time of Strabo, but is still noticed by Ptolemy.

References

Geography of ancient Anatolia
Populated places in ancient Pontus
Former populated places in Turkey
History of Giresun Province